SLNS Vijayabahu (P627) is an Advanced Offshore Patrol Vessel of the Sri Lanka Navy. The ship is named after King Vijayabahu I, the warrior king of the medieval Sri Lanka who founded the Kingdom of Polonnaruwa.

Formerly, USCGC Douglas Munro (WHEC-724) and USCGC  Munro (WHEC-724), a High Endurance Cutter of the United States Coast Guard, named for Signalman First Class Douglas A. Munro (1919–1942), the only Coast Guardsman to be awarded the Medal of Honor.

Munro was commissioned on September 27, 1971, at Avondale Shipyard in New Orleans, Louisiana. The tenth of twelve  cutters, she was the first to be named after a Coast Guard hero.  The previously commissioned 378-footers had been named for former secretaries of the Treasury, a tradition that began in 1830 when a cutter was named for Alexander Hamilton. Secretary of Transportation John A. Volpe and Douglas Munro's mother, Edith, were on hand to commission Munro.  The ship's original complement included 17 officers and 143 enlisted men. 

Douglas Munro was placed into In-Commission Special Status on March 31, 2021, beginning the process of decommissioning the final Hamilton-class cutter. Douglas Munro was decommissioned on April 24, 2021 and was transferred to the Sri Lanka Navy on October 26, 2021 under pennant number P 627. She was commissioned by President Ranil Wickramasinghe on 20 November 2022 as SLNS Vijayabahu, becoming the second Hamilton-class cutter in Sri Lanka Navy.

United States Coast Guard

1970s

The dedication of the ship took place on April 15, 1972, at Munros first homeport of Boston, Massachusetts. Secretary Volpe attended the ceremony. The first commanding officer was Captain John T. Rouse. While operating out of Boston, the ship's original missions included ocean station patrol and search and rescue.

The stay in Boston was not to last long, however, as Munro shifted to a new homeport of Seattle, Washington, on August 29, 1973. The Seattle Post-Intelligencer hailed the arrival of "Two (Munro and ) of the newest, finest ships in the Coast Guard fleet."  Seattle was also especially receptive to Munro because Douglas Munro himself had been a resident of Cle Elum, a small town in Washington State. While operating out of Seattle, Munro became more active in the fisheries enforcement mission and less active in the ocean station mission, which was quickly being made obsolete by technological advances. Alaskan fisheries were especially busy and controversial at this time. In 1971, for instance, the combined Japanese, Russian, Canadian, and South Korean fishing fleets had caught about ten times as many fish as the U.S. fleet did. Coast Guard action was badly needed to regulate the practices of these foreign fleets. Munro performed this mission with great success, including the seizure of the Korean longliner Dong Won No. 51 in June 1979.

1980s

In 1980, the ship moved to yet another new homeport: Honolulu, Hawaii.  While conducting training with the Japan Coast Guard in 1983 Munro was called upon to aid in the rescue and salvage operations for Korean Air Flight 007 in the Sea of Japan.  In 1986, Munro interdicted the motor vessel Line Island Trader, which had been attempting to enter the U.S. with 4.5 tons of marijuana. Later that same year, the ship underwent an extensive three-year Fleet Rehabilitation and Modernization (FRAM) program. Weapons systems were upgraded and many portions of the cutter were remodeled.  Upon being re-commissioned in November 1989, Munro was homeported at Coast Guard Island in Alameda, California.

1990s and 2000s

In 1997, the cutter seized the Russian fishing trawler Chernyayevo in the Bering Sea for violation of the Magnuson-Stevens Fisheries Conservation and Management Act of 1976, setting an important precedent for law enforcement along the U.S./Russia maritime boundary.  In 1998, Munro intercepted the Chinese vessel Chih Yung, carrying 172 people attempting to illegally enter the U.S.  In 1999, the cutter interdicted the fishing vessel Eduardo I, carrying 83 illegal Ecuadorian migrants.  Also in 1998, Munro interdicted the Mexican vessel Xolescuintle, seizing 11.5 tons of cocaine, one of the largest drug seizures in Coast Guard history.  In 1999, the cutter seized the motor vessel Wing Fung Lung, carrying 259 illegal Chinese migrants.  In 2003, the cutter interdicted the fishing vessel Candy I with 4 tons of cocaine. In 2003, the cutter interdicted two "go-fast" boats with 2 tons of cocaine using warning shots across the bow of one with an MH-68 "Stingray" Helicopter Interdiction Tactical Squadron (HITRON). Munro traveled on turbines for 16 hours to intercept the second, using dead reckoning based on the suspect vessel's course and speed to find it. The crew of the second "go-fast" then proceeded to light their vessel on fire to destroy the bales on board the vessel, but Munros crew quickly sank the vessel and later recovered approximately 139 bales of cocaine. Four traffickers were recovered with two needing medical assistance from Munros corpsman.

From December 2004 to June 2005, Munro operated in the Persian Gulf with the Bonhomme Richard Expeditionary Strike Group.  During the Out of Hemisphere patrol Munro contributed in the relief efforts of the 2004 tsunami providing food and water to Indonesia and later seizing a vessel overtaken by pirates off the Horn of Africa.  In 2006 the cutter interdicted two "go-fast" boats working in tandem with 2 tons of cocaine using disabling shots with an MH-68 "Stingray" HITRON.

As of September 4, 2007, Munro was home-ported in Kodiak, Alaska.

Munro deployed its HH-65 Dolphin helicopter to the sinking site, and received 20 of the surviving fishermen. The story of this rescue is detailed in Deadliest Sea: The Untold Story Behind the Greatest Rescue in Coast Guard History by Kalee Thompson. As Aviation Week & Space Technology states, "The USCG deems the operation the largest cold-water rescue in its history."

Munro was renamed to Douglas Munro to allow the new Legend-class cutter Munro, launched in 2015, to assume the former name of the Hamilton-class cutter.

Douglas Munro also made an appearance in an episode of the Discovery Channel series Deadliest Catch, conducting search and rescue operations following the loss of the fishing vessel Ocean Challenger.  It was also featured in the BBC series Full Circle with Michael Palin in 1997, as the presenter was on the ship at the end of his documentary circumnavigation of the Pacific Rim.

Douglas Munro completed its final deployment on March 13, 2021. It was decommissioned on April 24, 2021 in a decommissioning ceremony held at Coast Guard Base Kodiak in Kodiak, Alaska.

Sri Lanka Navy 

Following its decommission, she was transferred to the Sri Lanka Navy on 26 October 2021 at the USCG Station Seattle, where it was assigned the pennant number P 627. She becomes the second Hamilton-class cutter to be transferred to the Sri Lanka Navy after USCGC Sherman (WHEC-720). Like her sister ship, she retained its Otobreda 76 mm gun and MK 92 Fire Control System, while the Phalanx CIWS was removed and will be replaced with a rear mounted dual 23mm cannon. She underwent an extensive refit at Seattle before sailing to her new home to Sri Lanka having covered a long sea voyage of about 10656 nautical miles (19734km) transiting the Pacific and Indian Oceans, the ship finally arrived in Colombo on 2 November 2022. She was commissioned by President Ranil Wickramasinghe, in the presence of U.S. Ambassador to Sri Lanka Julie Chung on 20 November 2022 as SLNS Vijayabahu.

See also
SLNS Gajabahu (P626)
SLNS Parakramabahu (P625)

References

External links 
 USCGC Douglas Munro official website

Ships of the United States Coast Guard
Hamilton-class cutters
1971 ships
Ships built in Bridge City, Louisiana
Hamilton-class cutters of the Sri Lanka Navy